This is a list of New Zealand rugby union players who have played for the New Zealand national rugby sevens team.
The team is one of the most successful rugby sevens teams of all time. The team was coached for many years by Gordon Tietjens. As of 26 November 2011, 37 of these players have gone on to be All Blacks. The side has won 4 Gold Medals and were undefeated in the Commonwealth Games until 2014.

On 24 March 2011, Coach Tietjens picked his 'fantasy team' composed of the best players he believes to have played for New Zealand.

List

References

External links
Allblacks.com

 
Rugby sevens
Sevens